Nidhi Singh is an Indian television and film actress. She is known for her character as Tanya Nagpal in Permanent Roommates, an Indian web series created by The Viral Fever and Biswapati Sarkar in (2014–16). In 2018 she appeared as Ayesha Kumar in the film Dil Juunglee alongside Taapsee Pannu and Saqib Saleem. She made her debut through a multilingual short film Khuli Khidki in 2013. Nidhi was nominated for the Indian Television Academy Award for Best Actress in ITA Awards.

Life
Nidhi Singh was born in 1986 in Allahabad , Uttar Pradesh, India. She studied from St. Mary's Convent Inter College in Allahabad. Her father Birendra Singh is an Indian Railway personnel. Nidhi has an elder brother Rishabh Singh and a younger brother Shashwat Singh, who is a Hindi and Tamil singer.

Filmography

Films

Web series

References

External links

1986 births
Living people
Indian television actresses
Actresses in Hindi television
Indian film actresses
Indian actresses
Actresses from Uttar Pradesh